This is a list of islands of Norway sorted by name. For a list sorted by area, see List of islands of Norway by area.

A

 Alden
 Aldra
 Algrøy
 Alsta
 Altra
 Anda
 Andabeløya
 Andørja
 Andøya, Vesterålen
 Andøya, Agder
 Arnøy, Salten
 Arnøya
 Arøya
 Askerøya
 Askrova
 Askøy
 Aspøy
 Aspøya
 Atløy
 Austra
 Austvågøya
 Averøya
 Azero

B

 Barmen
 Barmøya
 Barøya
 Bear Island (Bjørnøya)
 Bergsøya, Gjemnes
 Bergsøya, Herøy
 Bispøyan
 Bjarkøya
 Bjorøy
 Bjørnøya
 Bjørøya
 Bleiksøya
 Blomøy
 Bokn
 Bolga
 Bolsøya
 Borgan
 Borøya, Tvedestrand
 Bouvetøya
 Bragdøya
 Brattøra
 Bremangerlandet
 Brottøya
 Bru
 Bulandet
 Bømlo
 Børøya

D

 Dimnøya
 Dolmøya
 Dryna
 Dvergsøya
 Dyrøya, Troms
 Dyrøya, Øksnes
 Dønna

E
 Edøya
 Eika, Møre og Romsdal
 Ellingsøya
 Elvalandet
 Engeløya
 Ertvågsøya

F

 Fanøya
 Fedje
 Feøy
 Finnøy
 Finnøya, Møre og Romsdal
 Fjellværsøya
 Fjøløy
 Fjørtofta
 Flakstadøya
 Flatøy
 Fleina
 Flekkerøy
 Flemsøya
 Flostaøya
 Flåvær
 Fogn
 Fosnøy
 Frei
 Froan
 Frøya (Trøndelag)
 Frøya, Bremanger
 Fugløya, Gildeskål
 Fugløya, Troms

G

 Gapøya
 Garten
 Gimsøya
 Giske
 Gisløy
 Gjerdøya
 Gjerdinga
 Gjesværstappan
 Godøya
 Gossa
 Grip
 Grisvågøya
 Grytøya
 Grøtøy
 Gurskøya

H

 Håja
 Håkøya
 Hadseløya
 Hafslundsøy
 Halsnøy
 Halsnøya
 Handnesøya
 Haramsøya
 Hareidlandet
 Harøya
 Havøya
 Helgbustadøya
 Helgøya, Hedmark
 Helgøya, Troms
 Hessa
 Hemnskjela
 Heng
 Hestmona
 Hidra
 Hille, Agder
 Hille
 Hillesøya
 Hinnøya
 Hisarøy
 Hisøya
 Hitra
 Hjelmsøya
 Hoddøya
 Holsnøy
 Hornøya
 Hovden
 Huftarøy
 Hugla
 Huglo
 Hulløya
 Humla
 Husevågøy
 Husøya
 Håja
 Håkøya

I

 Idsal
 Idse
 Igerøya
 Ingøya
 Inner-Vikna
 Innlandet

J
 Jan Mayen
 Justøy
 Jøa

K

 Karlsøy, Søndre og Nordre
 Karlsøya, Troms
 Karmøy
 Kirkelandet
 Kirkøy
 Kinn
 Kjøtta
 Klosterøy
 Knaplundsøya
 Kråkvåg
 Kunna
 Kvaløya, Tromsø
 Kvaløya, Finnmark
 Kvamsøy
 Kvamsøya
 Kvæøya
 Kvitsøy
 Kågen

L

 Landegode
 Langøya, Vesterålen
 Langøya, Øksnes
 Laukøya
 Lauvøya, Flatanger
 Lauvøya, Vikna
 Lauvøya, Åfjord
 Leka
 Leksa
 Leinøya
 Lepsøya
 Lille Ekkerøy
 Lille Kamøya, Hammerfest
 Lille Kamøya, Nordkapp
 Linesøya
 Litlmolla
 Loppa
 Lovund
 Lundøya
 Lurøya
 Løkta

M

 Magerøya
 Melkøya
 Mellom-Vikna
 Meløya
 Merdø
 Mesøya
 Mia/Midøya
 Mindlandet
 Mjømna
 Mosken
 Moskenesøya
 Mosterøy
 Munkholmen
 Myken
 Måsøya

N

 Nerlandsøya
 Nesøya, Akershus
 Nesøya, Nordland
 Nordlandet
 Nordkvaløya
 Nærøya
 Nørvøya
 Nøtterøy

O
 Odderøya
 Oksenøya
 Oksøy
 Ombo
 Ona
 Onøy
 Orta, Møre og Romsdal
 Osterøy
 Otrøya
 Otterøya

P
 Prestmåsøya
 Pysen

R

 Randøy
 Rangsundøya
 Rebbenesøy
 Reinøya, Troms
 Reinøya, Vardø
 Reksta
 Reksteren
 Remøya
 Rennesøy
 Ringvassøy
 Rolla
 Rolfsøya
 Rolvsøy
 Rottøya
 Runde
 Ruøya
 Ryke Yse
 Rødøya, Alstahaug
 Rødøya, Rødøy
 Røst
 Røvær

S

 Sandhornøya
 Sandøya, Møre og Romsdal
 Sandsøya, Møre og Romsdal
 Sandsøya, Troms
 Sandøya, Agder
 Sanna
 Seiland
 Sekken
 Selvær
 Seløy
 Senja
 Sessøya
 Silda, Finnmark
 Silda, Kinn
 Sjernarøyane
 Skardsøya
 Skarsøya
 Skjervøya (Troms)
 Skjervøya (Trøndelag)
 Skjernøy
 Sklinna
 Skogerøya
 Skogsøy
 Skogsøya
 Skorpa, Møre og Romsdal
 Skorpa, Kinn
 Skorpa, Troms
 Skrova
 Skålvær
 Smøla
 Sokn
 Solskjel
 Sør-Hidle
 Sotra
 Stabben (island)
 Stabblandet
 Stavøyna
 Stjernøya
 Stokkøya
 Stord
 Store Sommarøya
 Stormolla
 Store Kamøya, Hammerfest
 Store Kamøya, Nordkapp
 Store Tamsøy
 Storfosna
 Straumøya
 Sula, Solund
 Sula, Sunnmøre
 Sula, Trøndelag
 Sundøy (island)

 Svalbard archipelago
 Barentsøya
 Edgeøya
 Hopen
 Kong Karls Land
 Abel Island
 Helgoland Island
 Kongsøya
 Svenskøya
 Tirpitzøya
 Kvitøya

 Nordaustlandet
 Prins Karls Forland
 Spitsbergen
 Wilhelm Island
 Svanøya
 Svellingen
 Svinør
 Sørarnøya
 Sørøya

T

 Talgje
 Tarva
 Tautra
 Terøya
 Tindsøya
 Tjeldøya
 Tjona
 Tjøme
 Tjøtta
 Toftøy
 Tomma
 Torget
 Tromsøya
 Tromøya
 Træna
 Tussøya
 Tustna
 Tverrdalsøya
 Tysnesøy
 Tyssøy
 Tørla

U
 Ulvøya
 Uløya
 Utøya
 Utsira

V

 Vadsøya
 Vandve
 Vanna,  Vannøya
 Valderøya
 Varaldsøy
 Vardøya
 Vega
 Veidholmen
 Vengsøya
 Vesterøya
 Vestvågøya
 Veøya
 Vigra
 Villa
 Voksa
 Vorterøya
 Værlandet
 Værøy
 Vågsøy

Y
 Ylvingen
 Ytterøya
 Ytter-Vikna

Æ
 Ærøya

Ø
 Øksninga
 Østre Bolæren

Å
 Åmøy
 Åmøya
 Åsvær

See also 
 List of islands in the Atlantic Ocean
 List of islands
 List of islands of Norway by area

References 

Norway, List of islands of

Islands